Geruwa is a rural municipality located in Bardiya District of Lumbini Province of Nepal.

The rural municipality came into existence on 10 March 2017 when the government of Nepal decided to dissolve the old  administrative structure and reconstruct a new administrative division.

Patabhar, Gola, Pashupatinagar and Manau VDCs were merged to form this new rural municipality. The rural municipality is divided into 6 wards and Pashupatinagar was declared headquarter of the rural municipality. The total population of the municipality is 34871 individuals according to Nepal census 2011.

Demographics
At the time of the 2011 Nepal census, Geruwa Rural Municipality had a population of 34,885. Of these, 63.2% spoke Tharu, 35.5% Nepali, 0.8% Sonaha, 0.1% Newar, 0.1% Hindi, 0.1% Maithili, 0.1% Magar and 0.1% Doteli as their first language.

In terms of ethnicity/caste, 64.4% were Tharu, 13.8% Chhetri, 7.9% Hill Brahmin, 4.4% Thakuri, 4.2% Kami, 2.0% Damai/Dholi, 0.8% Magar, 0.6% Lohar, 0.5% Newar and 1.4% others.

In terms of religion, 98.4% were Hindu, 1.4% Christian, 0.1% Muslim and 0.1% Buddhist.

See also
Bardiya District
Lumbini Province

References

Rural municipalities of Nepal established in 2017
Rural municipalities in Bardiya District